Koya is a Muslim community, predominantly found in the city of Calicut in southern India. Scholars speculate Omani origin to the community and assume that the name is a corruption of the title "Khawaja". The powerful Koyas held administrative positions in the medieval Calicut court (Zamorin).

The Koyas are mostly concentrated in and around the Kuttichira region in Calicut. The Koya family was invited by Raja Keshavadas to Alleppey from Malabar during its formation. They were given permission to construct houses and to conduct trade to various parts of Travancore Kingdom. The Koya family in Alleppey still have their Major undivided property and Tharavads like Pyngamadom, Puthen nalakam, Pulikkalakath, Puthenveedu, Vyranveedu, are some. These Tharavads stands as historic monuments near Stone Bridge Alleppey.
Koyas are also found on the Laccadive Islands as well as in other parts of former South Malabar Taluk. 

The Koyas followed maternal kinship system ("marumakathayam").

References

Further reading
 The Production of Cosmopolitanism among the Koyas of Kozhikode, Kerala (SOAS) Filippo Osella and Caroline Osella

Social groups of Kerala
Mappilas